The 1979 AMA National Speedway Championship was held at Champion Speedway in Owego, New York. Promoters Jack Crawford and Joe Biesecker also owned the track.

AMA
1979 in American motorsport
Speedway in the United States
1979 in sports in New York (state)